Chakravarthy is a 1987 Indian Telugu-language film,  directed by Ravi Raja Pinisetty and produced by Kodali Venkateswara Rao. The film stars Chiranjeevi, Mohan Babu, Bhanupriya and Ramya Krishna. The film had a musical score by Chakravarthy. It was released on 4 June 1987.

Plot
Anji (Chiranjeevi) is a rough and tough guy, but he has soft spot for his sister Laxmi (Ramya Krishna). A Swamiji (J. V. Somayajulu) at his place, provides shelter to a number of orphans. Mohan (Mohan Babu) a childhood friend of Anji comes to that village as a police inspector. The president of that village tries to occupy the ashram by hook or by crook. He even sets the ashram on fire, but Anji, in an attempt to save children, loses his left eye. Swamiji requests Mohan to marry Anji's sister, but Laxmi is already in love with her classmate Prembabu. But, when Prembabu behaves nastily, Anji beats him black and blue, and Prembabu dies later. Now, Inspector Mohan is forced to arrest Chiranjeevi. Meanwhile, Swamiji is prohibited from entering the village on the pretext of he being the thief of temple's ornaments. The village's president is behind this conspiracy. All of a sudden, Chakravarthy, a world-famous disco dancer, comes to that village, who is none other than Anji in disguise, who proves of his innocence in Prembabu's murder case. The president is found guilty for all the evil happenings and is arrested. The story ends with Mohan marrying Laxmi.

Cast
Chiranjeevi as Anji/Chakravarthy
Mohan Babu as Mohan Rao
Bhanupriya as Rani
Ramya Krishna as Lakshmi
J. V. Somayajulu as Swamiji
Brahmanandam
Kaikala Satyanarayana as President

Soundtrack

Music composed by K. Chakravarthy was released through Lahari Music. Lyrics were written by Veturi and Sirivennela Seetharama Sastry.

References

External links
 

1987 films
Films scored by K. Chakravarthy
Geetha Arts films
1980s Telugu-language films
Telugu remakes of Tamil films
Films directed by Ravi Raja Pinisetty